Christl Hintermaier (born 30 January 1946 in Bad Reichenhall) is a German former alpine skier who competed in the 1968 Winter Olympics.

External links
 sports-reference.com
 

1946 births
Living people
German female alpine skiers
Olympic alpine skiers of West Germany
Alpine skiers at the 1968 Winter Olympics
People from Berchtesgadener Land
Sportspeople from Upper Bavaria
20th-century German people